Cameraria milletiae is a moth of the family Gracillariidae. It is known from Sarawak and Selangor, Malaysia.

The wingspan is 4.5-5.3 mm.

The larvae feed on Milletia sericea. They mine the leaves of their host plant. The mine has the form of an oval or elliptical blotch-mine occurring on the lower side of the leaflet. It is rather large, light brownish on the mining part in the lower view and mottled with pale green in the upper view. It is slightly tentiform, but without wrinkles on the lower epidermis. Pupation takes place inside the mine-cavity in a pupa encircled with a whitish, ellipsoidal, rough cocoon.

References

Cameraria (moth)
Moths described in 1993

Moths of Asia
Lepidoptera of Malaysia
Leaf miners
Taxa named by Tosio Kumata